The year 1902 in science and technology involved some significant events, listed below.

Aeronautics
 May 15 – Lyman Gilmore claims to have flown his steam-powered fixed-wing aircraft, although his proof is supposedly destroyed in a 1935 fire.

Chemistry
 Hermann Emil Fischer and Joseph von Mering discover that barbitone (barbital or Veronal) is an effective hypnotic agent. It becomes the first commercially marketed barbiturate, being used as a treatment for insomnia from 1903.
 Auguste Verneuil develops the Verneuil process for making synthetic rubies.
 German chemist Wilhelm Ostwald developed the Ostwald process and patented it in 1902.

Earth sciences
 April–August – Eruption of Mount Pelée in Martinique.
 Mercalli intensity scale introduced as a seismic scale for earthquakes by Giuseppe Mercalli.

Exploration
 December 30 – Discovery Expedition: British explorers Scott, Shackleton and Wilson reach the furthest southern point reached thus far by man, south of 82°S.

Genetics
 Walter Sutton (in the United States) and Theodor Boveri (in Germany) independently develop the Boveri–Sutton chromosome theory, explaining the mechanism underlying the laws of Mendelian inheritance by identifying chromosomes as the carriers of genetic material.

History of science
 May 17 – Archaeologist Valerios Stais identifies the Antikythera mechanism, now considered to be the oldest known analog computer.

Mathematics
 June 16 – Bertrand Russell writes to Gottlob Frege informing him of the problem in naive set theory that will become known as Russell's paradox.
 Gyula Farkas publishes the first proof of Farkas' lemma.
 Henri Lebesgue introduces the theory of Lebesgue integration.

Medicine
 January 1 – Nurses Registration Act 1901 comes into effect in New Zealand, making it the first country in the world to require state registration of nurses. On January 10, Ellen Dougherty becomes the world's first registered nurse.
 February – A commission on yellow fever in the United States announces that the disease is carried by mosquitoes.

Paleontology
 Remains of the second Tyrannosaurus rex specimen, the first recognized as such, are excavated by Barnum Brown in the Hell Creek Formation of Montana.

Physics
 Oliver Heaviside and Arthur E. Kennelly independently predict the existence of what will become known as the Kennelly-Heaviside Layer of the ionosphere.
 James Jeans finds the length scale required for gravitational perturbations to grow in a static nearly homogeneous medium.
 Philipp Lenard observes that maximum photoelectron energies are independent of illuminating intensity but depend on frequency.
 Gilbert N. Lewis develops the cubical atom atomic model.
 Theodor Svedberg suggests that fluctuations in molecular bombardment cause the Brownian motion.

Physiology
 William Bayliss and Ernest Starling make the first discovery of a hormone, secretin.

Psychology
 Vienna Psychoanalytic Society begins to meet as the Wednesday Psychological Society in Sigmund Freud's apartment.

Technology
 January 1 – Nathan Stubblefield demonstrates his wireless telephone device in Kentucky.
 July 17 – Willis Carrier devises the first modern air conditioning system for a plant in New York City.
 December 10 – Old Aswan Dam, designed by William Willcocks, completed across the River Nile in Egypt.
 First Vierendeel bridge built, across the Scheldt at Avelgem in Belgium.

Zoology
 October – First Mountain gorillas (Gorilla beringei beringei) discovered by Captain Robert von Beringe in German East Africa.

Institutions
 January 28 – The Carnegie Institution is founded in Washington, D.C., to promote scientific research with a $10 million gift from Andrew Carnegie.

Awards
 Nobel Prizes
 Physics – Hendrik Lorentz, Pieter Zeeman
 Chemistry – Hermann Emil Fischer
 Medicine – Ronald Ross
 Hughes Medal first awarded by the Royal Society of London to J. J. Thomson
 June 26 – First recipients of the Order of Merit in the United Kingdom include
 Lord Rayleigh
 Lord Kelvin
 Lord Lister
 Sir William Huggins

Births
 February 10 – Walter Houser Brattain (died 1987), American physicist.
 February 16 – Zhang Yuzhe (died 1986), Chinese astronomer.
 May 25 – Calvin Souther Fuller (died 1994), American physical chemist at AT&T Bell Laboratories.
 June 14 – Paul Lester Errington (died 1962), American conservationist.
 June 15 – Erik Erikson, né Salomonsen (died 1994), German-born psychologist.
 August 8 – Paul Dirac (died 1984), English physicist.
 August 13 – Felix Wankel (died 1988), German mechanical engineer.
 November 2 – Sergey Lebedev (died 1974), Russian computer scientist.

Deaths
 January 23 – Alfred William Bennett, British botanist (born 1833)
 February 11 – Caroline Rosenberg (born 1810) Danish botanist.
 March 6 – Moritz Kaposi (born 1837), Hungarian dermatologist.
 April 12 – Alfred Cornu (born 1841), French physicist
 May 26 – Almon Strowger (born 1839), American telecommunications engineer.
 September 5 – Rudolf Virchow (born 1821), German pathologist and biologist.
 September 18 – Thorborg Rappe (born 1832), Swedish pioneer in the education of students with Intellectual disability. 
 November 12 – William Henry Barlow (born 1812), English railway civil engineer.
 December 22 – Richard von Krafft-Ebing (born 1840), German sexologist.

References

 
20th century in science
1900s in science